Taşkent, formerly Pirlerkondu, is a town and district of Konya Province in the Akdeniz region of Turkey. It literally means The Stone City. According to 2000 census, population of the district is 46,396 of which 10,779 live in the town of Taşkent.

See also
Çetmi

Notes

References

External links
 District governor's official website 
 District municipality's official website 

Populated places in Konya Province
Districts of Konya Province